Pembrokeshire is only the fifth-largest county in Wales, but contains the second largest number of scheduled monuments (526) after Powys. This gives it an extremely high density of monuments, with 33.4 per 100km2. (Only the tiny county boroughs of Newport and Merthyr Tydfil have a higher density). With three-quarters of its boundary being coastline, Pembrokeshire occupies the western end of the West Wales peninsular, terminating with the tiny cathedral city of St David's. It was a historic county in its own right but between 1975 and 1996 it joined Carmarthen and Ceredigion in the much larger county of Dyfed.

Over two-thirds of Pembrokeshire's scheduled monuments (346) date to pre-historic times. Even this is too many entries to conveniently show in one list, so the list is subdivided into three, separating the Roman to modern on one list, and subdividing the prehistoric sites along the lines of the former local districts of Preseli Pembrokeshire, (the northern half) and South Pembrokeshire. The list below shows the 112 sites in the south. This includes hill forts, promontory forts on both coastal headlands and inland locations. It also includes a variety of enclosures, hut sites and Raths, a wide range of burial sites and other ritual and religious sites listed as barrows and chambered tombs, stone circles and standing stones. There is a matching list of 233 prehistoric sites in north Pembrokeshire

The county's 182 Roman, medieval and post-medieval sites are all included in the third Pembrokeshire list, which covers inscribed stones, stone crosses, holy wells, castles, mottes and baileys, priories, chapels and churches, houses, town walls and a Bishop's palace, along with a wide variety of post-medieval sites from coalmines, kilns and dovecotes through to World War II defensive structures.

Scheduled monuments have statutory protection. The compilation of the list is undertaken by Cadw Welsh Historic Monuments, which is an executive agency of the National Assembly of Wales. The list of scheduled monuments below is supplied by Cadw with additional material from RCAHMW and Dyfed Archaeological Trust.

Prehistoric scheduled monuments in south Pembrokeshire

See also
List of Cadw properties
List of castles in Wales
List of hill forts in Wales
Historic houses in Wales
List of monastic houses in Wales
List of museums in Wales
List of Roman villas in Wales

References
Coflein is the online database of RCAHMW: Royal Commission on the Ancient and Historical Monuments of Wales, DAT is the Dyfed Archaeological Trust, Cadw is the Welsh Historic Monuments Agency

Pembrokeshire
Monuments in south Pembrokeshire
 Pembrokeshire